Vanair was a domestic airline based in Vanuatu.  The airline flew to 29 destinations on 18 of Vanuatu's 83 islands, and was wholly owned by the Vanuatu government.

History 

The airline commenced operations as Air Melanesiæ in 1965 as a joint venture between two existing airlines, the British-owned New Hebrides Airways (founded in 1963) and French-owned Société Néo-Hébridaise de Transports Aériens, known as Hebridair (founded 1964). New Hebrides Airways contributed a de Havilland Australia DHA-3 Drover to the operation, while Hebridair provided a Dornier Do 28, however the Do 28 crashed in 1966. By the beginning of the 1970s the airline was controlled by Qantas and British Overseas Airways Corporation via their shareholdings in New Hebrides Airways, and by Union des Transports Aériens which had taken over Hebridair and renamed it Société Française des Nouvelles-Hébrides.  Sir Denise Buchanan of Tale Air Fame   Bought out Qantas BA and UTA in the late 1979's  and ran it very usefully with an Islander, a Trislander, several DH6 and an Embrea Bandrati, until the Government wanted to take over, so they ran him out of town by denying the renewal of the chief engines work permit. The Government subsequently set up Van Air as a government owned company. The Government owned airline was run successfully under the leadership of Mr Murray Pope but following his departure the airline nearly  collapsed with the introduction of an expensive lease on a Dash 8 air craft. As it was going broke it was merged with the Government's  International Airline, Air Vanuatu and de-merges again in 2001/2 only to go broke again, and to be re-merged with Air Vanuatu. In 2004, it merged with Vanuatu's government-owned flag carrier, Air Vanuatu.

Fleet 

At the time of the merger with Air Vanuatu the Vanair fleet included:

4 de Havilland Canada DHC-6 Twin Otter Series 300

1981

4 Britten-Norman Islander
1 Britten-Norman Trislander

1971

5 Britten-Norman Islander
1 de Havilland Australia DHA-3 Drover

Incidents and accidents
8 May 1999 - A Vanair de Havilland Canada DHC-6 Twin Otter with twelve people on board crashed into the sea near Port Vila during heavy rain. Seven people were killed.
25 July 1991 - A Britten-Norman Islander crashed into a mountain near Olpoi Airport. All nine people on board were killed.
30 January 1990 - A Vanair Britten-Norman Trislander crashed. Details unknown.

References

External links

Vanair
Air Melanesiae  was Privetly Owned and Mostly by Sir Denise Buchanan  He was forced to Move on and took Most of his Air craft to Australia  the Government set up a New Co.  and that was called Air Van 
Defunct airlines of Vanuatu
Airlines established in 1965
Airlines disestablished in 2004